La De Da may refer to:
 La De Da (album), by Joel Plaskett
 "La De Da", a song by Ringo Starr on the album Vertical Man
 La De Da (music festival), an annual music festival held in New Zealand
Lah-Di-Dah, a 1991 album by Jake Thackray
La Di Da, a song by Lennon Stella
 The La De Das, a New Zealand rock band
"La Di Da Di", a 1985 song by Doug E. Fresh
La Di Da Di, a 2015 album by Battles
"La Di Da", a 2020 song by Everglow
"La de da de da de da de day oh", a 2018 song by Bill Wurtz